This is a list of governors for Uppsala County of Sweden. Uppsala County and Stockholm County separated from Uppland County, the first time from 1641 to 1654, and then finally in 1719.

First Period
Göran Gyllenstierna, the elder (1640–1646)
Bengt Skytte (1646–1649)
Svante Larsson Sparre (1649–1652)
Svante Svantesson Banér (1652–1654)

Second Period

Footnotes

References

Uppsala
Governors of Uppsala County